Rabbit Junk is the first album by the Seattle-based digital hardcore band Rabbit Junk, released in 2004. A remastered edition was released in 2008 by Full Effect Records, mastered by Tom Baker, and both editions were re-released on September 6, 2019, through Rabbit Junk's Bandcamp page.

Background and recording
Frontman JP Anderson had this to say about the album upon its re-release in 2019:
"Almost immediately after The Shizit split, I started working on what would become "Rabbit Junk". I had become a bit tired of the super macho, super angry sound of The Shizit and I wanted to incorporate the quirky-poppy influence of Mad Capsule Markets along with punky female vocals. Sum Grrrl and I had been married for about a year and a half at this point (we were YOUNG!) and we moved from Seattle to LA briefly, where I recorded most of the record in a sweat-box in North Hollywood. I really wanted fem vox but didn't know any fem vocalists, so I literally dragged Sum Grrrl into my little make-shift studio and told her to yell. I thought she sounded just right! I had been using Pro Tools for about a year and had no idea what I was doing. The sound I was getting was pretty muddy, fuzzy, and boomy, but considering my background in digital hardcore it sounded acceptable. What became the debut album was originally intended just to be a demo. I printed up 500 copies and sold them on rabbitjunk.com - they were gone in months." - Anderson

Track listing

References

2004 albums
Rabbit Junk albums